Liu Stephen Garlock (born 18 May 1992 in Sydney), also known as Stephen Liu, is an Australian professional footballer who played as a full back for Hong Kong Premier League club HKFC. He is also of Irish and Hong Kong descent.

Club career

Early career
Stephen was born in Sydney, Australia to a Chinese father and an Irish mother. He started playing football when he was young, growing up in Australia. He moved to Japan when he was 7 years old. He joined FC Komazawa in 2007, where he was still playing as a midfielder or striker. He left the club in 2009 as he moved to Hong Kong.

HKFC
Stephen joined HKFC in the 2009–10 season. He was part of the team which was promoted to the First Division at the end of that season.

He started playing in a professional football league with HKFC in the 2010–11 season. He featured 8 league games in the season but failed to help the team avoid relegation to the Second Division. He stayed at the club competing in the Second Division.

Yokohama FC Hong Kong
Stephen joined First Division club Yokohama FC Hong Kong in January 2013. However, he was only featured in Reserve Division matches after he joined the club, and was on the bench twice in the First Division.

South China
Stephen joined defending First Division champions South China for an undisclosed fee on 2 July 2013.

Career statistics

Club
 As of 4 May 2013

Notes
1.  Others include Hong Kong Season Play-offs.
2.  Hong Kong Junior Challenge Shield was not held in the 2009–10 season.
3.  Since Hong Kong FC was competing in lower divisions, they could only join the Junior Shield instead of Senior Shield.

References

External links
 
 South China AA Player Profile
 Stephen Garlock Liu at HKFA

1992 births
Living people
Association football fullbacks
Hong Kong FC players
South China AA players
Hong Kong Premier League players
Hong Kong First Division League players
Yokohama FC Hong Kong players
Soccer players from Sydney
Australian expatriate soccer players
Australian soccer players